= Alero Olympio =

Ghanaian architect

Alero Olympio is a Ghanaian architect who practiced extensively in Ghana and was based in Edinburgh, Scotland. She is the architect who designed the Kokrobitey Institute. This institute includes the Alero Olympio Design Center, which was named in her honor.

== Career ==
Alero Olympio was internationally renowned for her commitment to using local materials such as laterite, wood and stone, and her passion for leveraging local experience and expertise to seek alternative construction methods. She has traveled extensively both in Africa and around the world, translating her experience through her design and architectural innovations.

== Death ==
Alero battled cancer for 6 years and died in Edinburgh on August 31, 2005.

== Books ==
- Akosua in Brazil, 1970.
